Atomic Weapons Rewards Act of 1955 authorized financial transactions for information pertaining to the unlawful acquisition, importation, or manufacture of special nuclear material into the United States. The United States federal statute specifies financial reward payments of fifty thousand dollars be approved by the United States President with an inclusion not to exceed five hundred thousand dollars. The Act of Congress established an Awards Board embodying Federal Directorates from Secretary of the Treasury, Secretary of Defense, Attorney General, Central Intelligence, and Atomic Energy Commission.

Senate bill 609 legislation was passed by the 84th United States Congressional session and enacted into law by the 34th President of the United States Dwight Eisenhower on July 15, 1955.

Sections of the Act
Atomic Weapons Rewards Act was authored as seven sections defining the United States codified law formulation for appropriating United States currency for fissile material information.

Atomic Weapons Rewards Act Amendment of 1974
The 93rd United States Congressional session amended the 1955 Act with the passage of Senate bill 3669. The legislation was enacted into law by the 38th President of the United States Gerald Ford on August 17, 1974.

See also

References

Bibliography

Periodical Resources

Historical Video Archives

External links
 
 
 
 

1955 in American law
Arms control
Military disbanding and disarmament
Nuclear history of the United States
Nuclear weapons infrastructure of the United States
United States Atomic Energy Commission
United States federal criminal legislation
84th United States Congress